David Sultan (born 28 November 1966) is a Trinidadian cricketer. He played in five first-class and two List A matches for Trinidad and Tobago in 1991/92 and 1992/93.

See also
 List of Trinidadian representative cricketers

References

External links
 

1966 births
Living people
Trinidad and Tobago cricketers